Družba Pere Kvržice is a Croatian children's film directed by Vladimir Tadej. It was released in 1970.

It is based on the children's novel of the same name by Mato Lovrak.

Cast 
 Mladen Vasary - Pero Kvržica
 Predrag Vuković - Silo
 Berislav Kokot - Divljak
 Boris Vujović - Milo dijete
 Zoran Havrle - Medo
 Nikica Halužan - Budala
 Marina Nemet - Marija
 Dubravka Dolovčak - Danica
 Boris Dvornik - Policajac Jozo
 Antun Vrdoljak - Ucitelj
 Adem Čejvan - Perov otac
 Inge Appelt - Perova majka
 Mato Ergović - Markan - gazda Marko
 Antun Nalis - Velečasni

References

External links
 
 Croatian film archive: List of Croatian films from 1944 to 2006

1970 films
1970s Croatian-language films
Yugoslav children's films
Films based on Croatian novels
Croatian children's films